Artyushkino is a rural locality (a selo) and the administrative center of Artyushkinskoye Rural Settlement, Anninsky District, Voronezh Oblast, Russia. The population was 500 as of 2018. There are 13 streets.

Geography 
Artyushkino is located 50 km southeast of Anna (the district's administrative centre) by road. Vyazovka is the nearest rural locality.

References 

Rural localities in Anninsky District